Death of a Neapolitan Mathematician is a 1992 Italian drama film, written and directed by Mario Martone.

The film earned nine awards and was nominated for two, with director and writer Mario Martone winning seven awards.

Plot

Cast
 Carlo Cecchi as Renato Caccioppoli
 Anna Bonaiuto as Anna
 Renato Carpentieri as Luigi Caccioppoli
 Toni Servillo as Pietro
 Licia Maglietta as Emilia
  Antonio Neiwiller as Don Simplicio

Awards

Won
49th Venice International Film Festival 1992:
Grand Special Jury Prize – Mario Martone
Kodak Cinecritica Award – Mario Martone
Pasinetti Award – Best Actor: Carlo Cecchi
Angers European First Film Festival 1993:
C.I.C.A.E. Award – Mario Martone
European Jury Award – Feature Film: Mario Martone
SACD Grand Prize – Mario Martone
David di Donatello Awards 1993:
David Award – Best New Director: Mario Martone
Special David Award – Carlo Cecchi
Italian National Syndicate of Film Journalists 1993:
Silver Ribbon Award – Best New Director: Mario Martone

Nominated
European Film Awards 1993:
European Film Award – Best Actor: Carlo Cecchi
Italian National Syndicate of Film Journalists 1993:
Silver Ribbon – Best Actor: Carlo Cecchi

External links

1992 films
Italian drama films
Venice Grand Jury Prize winners
Films directed by Mario Martone
1990s Italian-language films
1990s Italian films